

Currently existing churches

Orthodox churches 

 Orthodox Church of Ukraine, also called Ukrainian Orthodox Church (December 15, 2018–), established by a union of the UOC-KP, UAOC, and some members of the UOC-MP
Ukrainian Orthodox Church – Kyiv Patriarchate (UOC-KP) (1992–December 15, 2018; 20 June 2019–), which reestablished its independence by declaring itself independent from the Orthodox Church of Ukraine on 20 June 2019 after a conflict within the OCU.
 Ukrainian Orthodox Church (Moscow Patriarchate) (1990–), an autonomous church under jurisdiction of the Russian Orthodox Church
 Ukrainian Autocephalous Orthodox Church Canonical (1924–)
 Ukrainian Orthodox Church of Canada, under jurisdiction of the Ecumenical Patriarchate of Constantinople
 Ukrainian Orthodox Church of the USA, under jurisdiction of the Ecumenical Patriarchate of Constantinople
 Ukrainian Orthodox Vicariate Sighetu Marmației, a vicariate of the Romanian Orthodox Church serving Eastern Orthodox believers from Romania's Ukrainian community
 (2001–), a church which includes elements from Orthodoxy and the Reformation

Catholic churches 

 Ukrainian Greek Catholic Church, an Eastern Catholic church of the Byzantine Rite, centered in Ukraine
 Ukrainian Orthodox Greek Catholic Church (2008–), an independent Ukrainian Greek Catholic Church that was established from the official Ukrainian Greek Catholic Church, which self-identifies as both Orthodox and Catholic
 Catholic Church in Ukraine, incorporating all communities and institutions of the Catholic Church in Ukraine

Historical Churches

Orthodox churches 

 For the Orthodox church in Ukraine before the 20th century, see: List of Metropolitans and Patriarchs of Kiev and Metropolitan of Kiev and all Rus'

 Ukrainian Autonomous Orthodox Church (1941–44), a short-lived Ukrainian church that existed when Ukraine was occupied by Nazi Germany during the Second World War
 Living Church (May 1922–July 26, 1946), an independent liberal church
 Ukrainian Autocephalous Orthodox Church (1922–December 15, 2018), dissolved itself  to form the Orthodox Church of Ukraine

See also
 Christianity in Ukraine
 History of Christianity in Ukraine
 Ukrainian Orthodox Church (disambiguation)
 Ukrainian Catholic Church (disambiguation)